The Boulevard Hotel is a 4-star business hotel, located at Mid Valley City, Kuala Lumpur. It is part of the hotel chain CHM Hotels. The 4 star hotel is located next to the main entrance of the Mid Valley Megamall.

2004 establishments in Malaysia
Hotels in Kuala Lumpur
Hotel buildings completed in 2004